Goldsboro (formerly Goldsborough) is a borough in York County, Pennsylvania, United States. The population was 930 at the 2020 census.

For historical reasons, the post office in Goldsboro is named "Etters" even though there is no incorporated place known by that name, and the United States Postal Service (USPS) states that the name "Etters" is preferred over "Goldsboro" for addressing mail to ZIP code 17319.

History
In 1738 Nathan Hussey, a Quaker, from New Castle County, Delaware, obtained a grant for land on which the Village of Goldsboro now stands. In 1743 a road from Walnut Bottom, now in Cumberland County, to Hussey's ferry was built.  The turnpike was completed in 1816 from York to Harrisburg. Along the turnpike, near the site of Hussey's Ferry (now Middletown Ferry) Henry Etter established Etter's Tavern, which included Etter's Post Office by 1838. Goldsboro was founded in 1850 upon completion of a railroad from York Haven to Harrisburg.  Prior to completion of the railroad the 20 or so houses that made up Goldsboro were affectionately referred to as Martinsville, for Martin P. Burger who owned a store near the village.  When the railway was completed in 1850, the village was named Goldsborough in honor of J.M. Goldsborough, the civil engineer of the railway.  Dr. Alexander Small in 1849 surveyed Goldsborough and officially advertised lots for sale in the village of Goldsborough as early as November 19, 1850.  The Borough of Goldsborough was incorporated in 1864.

A historical association was founded in 1976. The Goldsboro Historic District was listed on the National Register of Historic Places in 1984.

The American Lightweight Championship
On January 15, 1867, a prize fight took place in a field just north of Goldsboro between Sam Collyer and Johnny McGlade for the American Lightweight championship of boxing, and a purse of $2000. It was a bare-knuckle fight, which was illegal at the time, so they planned the match for the same day as the inauguration of the Governor of Pennsylvania in Harrisburg, the Civil War General John W. Geary, thinking that more attention would be on that event. The York County sheriff arrived after securing a posse with the Zeigle Guards, a military company already on their way to attend the inauguration. However due to a miscommunication, the guards did not get off the train in Goldsboro, so the sheriff was left alone to try and make any arrests, which he was unable to. 

The fight lasted 47 rounds in 55 minutes. Collyer was the winner and kept the American Lightweight Title. It was estimated that between 1000 and 2000 spectators were in attendance, including members of the PA state legislature, gamblers and underworld figures Kit Burns and Harry Hill, plus other boxers and former title holders of the day Young Barney Aaron, Dan Kerrigan, Johnny Moneghan and Joe Coburn. It was estimated over $200,000 in bets were won as a result of the fight.

Source of the name "Etters"
The name "Etters", used by the USPS to refer to the post office in Goldsboro, comes from the establishment in 1838 of a post office inside a tavern owned by Henry Etter, a former Revolutionary War soldier, about a mile north of the current location of Goldsboro.  The post office was moved to Goldsboro in 1850, at which time it retained the name "Etters" to avoid confusion with the already established post office in Gouldsboro, Wayne County, PA.  The 17319 ZIP code also covers other parts of York County well beyond the borough of Goldsboro, including parts of Fairview Township, Valley Green, Newberry Township, Lewisberry Borough, and Yocumtown Village.

Geography
Goldsboro is located along the Susquehanna River and has a view of the Three Mile Island Nuclear Generating Station, the site of the largest nuclear accident in the United States.

Demographics

As of the census of 2000, there were 939 people, 333 households, and 260 families residing in the borough. The racial makeup of the borough was 98.51% White, 0.21% Native American, 0.53% Asian, 0.11% Pacific Islander, and 0.64% from two or more races. Hispanic or Latino of any race were 0.64% of the population.

Of the 333 households, 46.5% had children under the age of 18 living with them, 67.6% were married couples living together, 7.8% had a female householder with no husband present, and 21.9% were non-families. 17.7% of all households were made up of individuals, and 3.9% had someone living alone who was 65 years of age or older. The average household size was 2.82 and the average family size was 3.24.

In the borough the population was spread out, with 32.2% under the age of 18, 5.4% from 18 to 24, 40.4% from 25 to 44, 15.9% from 45 to 64, and 6.2% who were 65 years of age or older. The median age was 33 years. For every 100 females, there were 103.7 males. For every 100 females age 18 and over, there were 100.9 males.

The median income for a household in the borough was $57,054, and the median income for a family was $60,455. Males had a median income of $40,250 versus $31,146 for females. The per capita income for the borough was $19,164. About 1.7% of families and 2.3% of the population were below the poverty line, including 3.0% of those under age 18 and none of those age 65 or over.

Education
The Goldsboro community is served by the West Shore School District.

Notable residents
Greg Gross, former professional baseball outfielder, pinch hitter and 1980 World Series Champion.
J. Michael Bishop, immunologist, microbiologist and 1989 Nobel Prize in Physiology or Medicine winner.

Image Gallery

References

External links
Goldsboro official site
Goldsboro Historical Association

Pennsylvania populated places on the Susquehanna River
Populated places established in 1850
Boroughs in York County, Pennsylvania
1850 establishments in Pennsylvania